The term sheltered workshop refers to an organization or environment that employs people with disabilities separately from others, usually with exemptions from labor standards, including but not limited to the absence of minimum wage requirements.

Australia

Sheltered workshops are often called Australian Disability Enterprises or ADEs. In Australia, employees with intellectual disabilities make up 75% of the ADE workforce. The Australian Disability Enterprise (ADE) sector in Australia generally has its roots in the early 1950s when families of people with disabilities established sheltered workshops to provide vocational activity for people with disability. At this time employment opportunities for people with disability were extremely limited.

In 1986, following the passage of the Commonwealth Disability Services Act (1986), Australia transitioned from the sheltered workshop system to the new model prioritizing employment for people with disabilities. In 1996, additional reforms were introduced for the purpose of improving service quality, matching service funding to the support needs of people with disability receiving assistance, and to link funding to employment outcomes. This led to a reform agenda in the ADE sector, with the introduction of legislated Quality Assurance standards that required ADEs to obtain independent verification of their compliance to these prior to receiving ongoing funding from the Australian Government. Additionally, a funding model that links payments to individual support needs was introduced.

In some ADEs individuals are paid as little as $1.79 an hour, based on the BSWAT (Business Services Wage Assessment Tool), which was found to be discriminatory in 2013 and will be phased out by April 2015. Wages are based on a percentage of award rates, according to the workplace competencies and productivity of the person with a disability in comparison to a worker without a disability. Wages are based on a percentage of award rates, according to the workplace competencies and productivity of the person with a disability in comparison to a worker without a disability. 

Following on from the court challenge on the discriminatory nature of the BSWAT, a large percentage of parents and employees of ADEs (along with the relevant Peak Body, National Disability Services) began a campaign to ensure their jobs were protected. Many raised the point that ADEs are not typical workplaces and provide significantly more support and opportunities than open employment workplaces. These parents, carers and Employees were concerned that if ADEs were forced to pay full livable award wages for employees with a disability, many would be financially unsustainable.  An episode of the ABC's Background Briefing in September 2014 discounted many of the parents and ADE's claims as deceptive spin, for sustaining the exploitative nature of the entire scheme.

Canada

In Canada sheltered workshops are being phased out for supported employment but remain a predominant vocational model for people with intellectual disabilities, who have an employment rate of less than 30%.

Europe
Sheltered workshops are one of the most common methods for employment across Europe.

United Kingdom

In the U.K., the Disabled Persons (Employment) Act of 1944 founded a company primarily to help returning veterans return to work called Remploy. Remploy founded factories across the United Kingdom. In 1986, 55,000 disabled people had been employed in the factories at some point. However, the UK moved towards mainstream employment, rather than sheltered workshops. By 2013, all Remploy factories were closed.

United States

The Fair Labor Standards Act of 1938 established a minimum wage in the United States; however, Section 14(c) of the bill included an exception for people with disabilities. Employers who wish to pay less than minimum wage must acquire a certificate by U.S. Department of Labor.

In the U.S.,  both the term "sheltered workshop" and its replacement term, "work center," are used by the Wage and Hour Division of the U.S. Department of Labor to refer to entities that are authorized to employ workers with disabilities at sub-minimum wages.  The term has generally been used to describe facilities that employ people with disabilities exclusively or primarily.

Sheltered workshops in the U.S. have become the subject of criticism for being exploitative, abusive and discriminatory.  In January 2011, the National Disability Rights Network, or NDRN, issued a report titled "Segregated and Exploited:  The Failure of the Disability Service System to Provide Quality Work."  The report charged that "hundreds of thousands of people with disabilities are being isolated and financially exploited by their employers."

In March 2011, a speech by Samuel R. Bagenstos, the Principal Deputy Assistant Attorney General in the Civil Rights Division of the U.S. Department of Justice, cited the NDRN report in explicitly criticizing the entire concept underlying the sheltered workshop.  Bagenstos took the position that the principle articulated in the U.S. Supreme Court decision in Olmstead v. L.C.—which he described as "that persons with disabilities have a right to spend their lives in the most integrated setting appropriate for them as individuals" -- "is just as sensibly applied to the employment setting."   He argued that "a full and equal life in the community—the ultimate goal of Olmstead—cannot be achieved without a meaningful, integrated way to spend the day, including integrated 'work options.'"  And he stated:

[W]hen individuals with disabilities spend years— indeed, decades—in congregate programs doing so-called jobs like these, yet do not learn any real vocational skills, we should not lightly conclude that it is the disability that is the problem. Rather, the programs’ failure to teach any significant, job-market-relevant skills leaves their clients stuck. As a recent review of the literature concludes, “[t]he ineffectiveness of sheltered workshops for helping individuals progress to competitive employment is well established.”

Many disability advocates campaign for Employment First policies, instead of sheltered workshops. Employment First is the idea that people with a disability should receive competitive, integrated employment with the supports that they need to succeed at that job. One slogan of Employment First is "real work for real pay." Organizations that support Employment First include the Association of People Supporting Employment First, the Autistic Self Advocacy Network and many other disability rights organizations.

On a national level, Congressional legislation that would phase out sheltered workshops has been proposed multiple times. Most recently, the Transformation to Competitive Integrated Employment Act (TCIEA) was introduced in 2021. 

On a state level, legislative efforts to ban subminimum wage have been more effective. Vermont was the first state to ban sheltered workshops, but numerous states have followed, including Maryland.

References

Accessibility
Social entrepreneurship
Developmental disabilities
Segregation